Finland Proper is a province in south-western Finland, the city of Turku being the capital.

Finland Proper may also refer to:
 Finland Proper (historical province), a historical province of the kingdom of Sweden with roughly the same area
 Mainland Finland, Finland excluding the Åland islands

See also 
Finland
Österland
Sweden-Finland
Sweden proper